Cornelius Wilhelmus "Corra" Dirksen (22 January 1938 – 10 July 2020) was a South African rugby player. He won 10 caps and scored three tries.

Biography
Dirksen made his international debut against Australia in 1963. The 1967 series against France was probably his finest hour, scoring all three of his test tries against them. The French were understandably quite wary of him throughout that series, dubbing him Le Monster (The Monster).

He played for the then Northern Transvaal (now Blue Bulls) and the Oostelikes (Easterns) club in Pretoria, which later merged with Adelaars to form Naka Bulls. After retiring from playing he qualified as a medical practitioner, and moved to Krugersdorp.

He died from COVID-19 complications during the COVID-19 pandemic in South Africa on 10 July 2020.

Test history

See also
 List of South Africa national rugby union players – Springbok no. 393

References

External links
 Corra Dirksen at the Springbok Rugby Hall of Fame

1938 births
2020 deaths
South African rugby union players
People from Vereeniging
Afrikaner people
Rugby union wings
South Africa international rugby union players
Rugby union players from Gauteng
Deaths from the COVID-19 pandemic in South Africa
Blue Bulls players